Daniel Shewchuk (b. 1959 or 1960) is a Canadian politician, who was elected as the Member of the Legislative Assembly for the electoral district of Arviat in the Legislative Assembly of Nunavut in the 2008 territorial election. In that election, he gained 48.4% of the vote, 22% more than his closest competitor. As of April 2010 he is the Minister of Environment, Minister of Human Resources and Minister Responsible for the Nunavut Arctic College.

References

External links 
  . Biography at the Legislative Assembly of Nunavut web site
 Candidate Profile at Northern News Services Online

1944 births
Living people
Members of the Legislative Assembly of Nunavut
21st-century Canadian politicians
People from Arviat